The list of Olympic ice hockey players for East Germany consists of 16 skaters and 2 goaltenders. Men's ice hockey tournaments have been staged at the Olympic Games since 1920 (it was introduced at the 1920 Summer Olympics, and was permanently added to the Winter Olympic Games in 1924). East Germany participated in one tournament during its existence: the 1968 Winter Olympics, where they finished eighth of the fourteen nations competing.

Lothar Fuchs had the most goals (5), while Dietmar Peters had the most assists (5) and points (7)

Key

Goaltenders

Skaters

See also
 East Germany national ice hockey team

Notes

References
 
 
 
 

East Germany national ice hockey team
ice hockey
East Germany
East Germany